Warren Mott High School (WMHS, commonly referred to as Mott) is a public high school in Warren, Michigan, United States. It is part of the Warren Consolidated Schools district. It was founded in 1992 by the merger of the previous Warren High School and C.S. Mott High School.

Demographics 
The demographic breakdown of the 1,448 students enrolled for the 2020–2021 school year was:
Male - 52.4%
Female - 47.6%
Native American/Alaskan - 0.1%
Asian - 24.5%
Black - 15.0%
Hispanic - 1.5%
Native Hawaiian/Pacific Islander - 0.1%
White - 56.2%
Multiracial - 2.7%

In addition, 70.2% of the students qualified for free or reduced lunches.

Notable alumni 
 Gregg Bissonette, musician
 Matt Bissonette, musician
 Lauren Flax, DJ
 Rachel Komisarz, Olympic swimmer (medalist)
 Dean Hamel, professional football player, Washington Redskins, Dallas Cowboys
 Norm Wells, American football player
 Kenny Goins, basketball player

References

Public high schools in Michigan
Schools in Macomb County, Michigan
1992 establishments in Michigan